Jesuit University Ignatianum in Kraków (JUI) is a private Catholic higher education institution run by the Society of Jesus in Kraków, Poland. It is officially recognized by the state of Poland. It has faculties of philosophy conferring the MA and PhD and of Education conferring the MA.

History
Ignatianum traces its roots back to 1867 when the didactic-scientific center Seminar Cracoviense Societatis Jesu was established in Kraków. In 1932 the Faculty of Philosophy of the Society of Jesus in Kraków received the rights of a Catholic school of university standing. In 1989, after social changes in Poland, it was possible for Jesuits to set up Ignatianum, a legal status Papal University. It has faculties of philosophy and education conferring MA degrees, as well as the PhD in philosophy, through agreement between the Government and the Catholic bishops in Poland.

In October 1989 the Religious Culture Institute was established, a two-year philosophical and theological program of studies for lay people, and in 1990 the religious pedagogy department for training lay teachers of religious education. On October 1, 2011 the name of the school was changed from Jesuit University of Philosophy and Education Ignatianum to Jesuit University Ignatianum. Since 2012, the Ignatianum has conferred the PhD in Humanities within the discipline of cultural studies and philosophy.

The philosophy department offers majors in philosophy, cultural studies, psychology, and journalism and public communication. The education department offers majors in pedagogy, political studies, social work, administration and public policy, and English philology. Full-time studies can be pursued through the web.

Further offerings
In its University of the Third Age Ignatianum offers courses to the 50-and-over group, to help them contribute to society in their advancing years. There is also an academy for children.

Since 1973 Ignatianum has published books and 6 scientific journals: two annuals – Yearbook of the Faculty of Philosophy and Yearbook of the Faculty of Education – and three twice-yearly journals – Philosophical Forums, Perspectives of Culture, and Horizons of Education – along with Horizons of Politics. The Jesuit library on site has over 400,000 volumes and more than 500 magazines (170 foreign); there is a modern reading room. Catalogues of the library are computerized and accessible on the Internet. The academic staff at the University includes 270 teachers and research scholars. There are 3730 students.

See also
 List of Jesuit sites

References

Educational institutions established in 1932
Universities and colleges in Kraków
1932 establishments in Poland